The Composite Index of National Capability (CINC) is a statistical measure of national power created by J. David Singer for the Correlates of War project in 1963.  It uses an average of percentages of world totals in six different components.  The components represent demographic, economic, and military strength. More recent studies tend to use the (CINC) score, which “focuses on measures that are more salient to the perception of true state power” beyond GDP.  It is still “among the best-known and most accepted methods for measuring national capabilities.”

Methodology
Each component is a dimensionless percentage of the world's total.

RATIO=

CINC = 

Where

TPR = total population of country ratio

UPR = urban population of country ratio

ISPR = iron and steel production of country ratio

ECR = primary energy consumption ratio

MER = military expenditure ratio

MPR = military personnel ratio

List of countries by CINC
Countries listed by CINC, data is from 2007

See also
Comprehensive National Power
Power in international relations

References

Reference works
Singer, Joel David: The Correlates of War. Testing some Realpolitik Models. New York: The Free Press, 1980.

International relations theory
International security
International rankings